The 2002 S-Pulse season was S-Pulse's eleventh season in existence and their tenth season in the J1 League. The club also competed in the Emperor's Cup and the J.League Cup. The team finished the season eighth in the league.

Competitions

Domestic results

J. League 1

Emperor's Cup

J. League Cup

Group stage

Final stage

International results

Asian Cup Winners' Cup

Shimizu S-Pulse qualified for this tournament as runners-up of the 2000 Emperor's Cup, as the winners (Kashima Antlers) have already qualified to the Asian Club Championship as the league winners.
Second round

Quarterfinals

AFC Champions League (qualification)

Shimizu S-Pulse entered the qualifying rounds as winners of the 2001 Emperor's Cup.
Third qualifying round

Fourth qualifying round

Shimizu S-Pulse qualified to the 2002–03 AFC Champions League.

Player statistics

Other pages
 J. League official site

Shimizu S-Pulse
Shimizu S-Pulse seasons